Tom Kenny has been featured in films, television shows, and video games. He is known for voicing the title character in the SpongeBob SquarePants franchise. In addition, Kenny has voiced many other characters in the series, including Gary the Snail, the French Narrator, and his live action portrayal as Patchy the Pirate whom Patchy was featured in various other appearances from the episodes Christmas Who? (2000) to SpongeBob's Road to Christmas (2021). His other roles include Heffer Wolfe in Rocko's Modern Life; the Ice King in Adventure Time; the Narrator and Mayor in The Powerpuff Girls; Carl Chryniszzswics and Brother Ernie in Johnny Bravo; Dog and Cliff in CatDog; Hank and Jeremy in Talking Tom and Friends; and Spyro from the Spyro the Dragon video game series. His live-action work includes the comedy variety shows The Edge and Mr. Show. He currently voices Augie Doggie, Top Cat, Hardy Har Har, Ding-A-Ling Wolf, Undercover Elephant and Ricochet Rabbit.

Kenny has won two Daytime Emmy Awards and two Annie Awards for his voice work as SpongeBob SquarePants and the Ice King. Kenny often collaborates with his wife Jill Talley, who plays Karen on the aforementioned series.

Voice-over roles

Animation

Feature films

Direct-to-video films

Video games

Live-action roles

Feature films

Television

References

Citations

Book sources
 
 
 
 

Male actor filmographies
American filmographies